Katona is a Hungarian surname meaning "soldier".

People 
 Ervin Katona (born 1977), Serbian strongman competitor 
 Gábor Katona, retired Hungarian triple jumper
 George Katona, Hungarian-born American psychologist
 Gyula O. H. Katona, Hungarian mathematician
 Gyula Y. Katona, Hungarian mathematician, son of Gyula O. H. Katona
 Iggy Katona, American stock car racer
 Jacqui Katona, environmental and cultural protection activist
 József Katona, Hungarian playwright and poet
 Kálmán Katona, Hungarian politician
 Kerry Katona, TV presenter, writer, columnist and former pop singer
 Nándor Katona, Hungarian-Slovak painter
 Nisha Katona, MBE, British former barrister, now a celebrity chef and restaurateur
 Péter Katona, member of the guitar duo Katona Twins
 Sándor Katona, Hungarian glider aerobatic pilot
 Sándor Katona, Hungarian association footballer
 Tamás Katona, Hungarian politician, historian
 Zoltán Katona, member of the guitar duo Katona Twins

Places 
 Katona is the Hungarian name for Cătina Commune, Cluj County, Romania

See also 
 Katonah (disambiguation)

Hungarian words and phrases
Hungarian-language surnames
Occupational surnames